Poshteh Rizeh-ye Sofla (also Romanized as Poshteh Rīzeh-ye Soflá) is a village in Sar Firuzabad Rural District, Firuzabad District, Kermanshah County, Kermanshah Province, Iran. At the 2006 census, its population was 87, in 19 families.

References 

Populated places in Kermanshah County